George Bassett (1818–1886) was an English businessman.

George Bassett or Basset may also refer to:

George Basset (or Bassett, –), English M.P. from Cornwall
George Bassett (Australian politician) (1888–1972), New South Wales politician
George Bassett, character in The Rockford Files (season 5)